Ilja Zeljenka (21 December 1932 – 13 July 2007) was a Slovak composer.

Born in Bratislava, Zeljenka studied music with Ján Cikker from 1951-1956. During the 1970s his more experimental idiom was suppressed by the Communist regime in Czechoslovakia, and he produced music based on folk music and neoromantic styles. His very large output includes three operas (including Bátoryčka (1994), based on the story of Elizabeth Báthory and Posledné dni Veľkej Moravy [The Last Days of Greater Moravia] (1996)), film music, piano works (including two pieces for piano and bongos), fourteen string quartets, nine symphonies, theatre music and electronic music. Among his vocal compositions is the cantata Oświęcim (1959), about the Auschwitz concentration camp.

References
Notes

Sources
 Jurík, Marián, and Peter Zagar (1998). 100 slovenských skladateľov (in Slovak). Bratislava: Národné hudobné centrum. .

Musicians from Bratislava
1932 births
2007 deaths
Slovak composers
Male composers
20th-century classical composers
Slovak opera composers
21st-century classical composers
Male classical composers
20th-century male musicians
21st-century male musicians
Slovak male musicians